John Franklin McKinney (April 12, 1827 – June 13, 1903) was an American lawyer and politician who served two non-consecutive terms as a U.S. Representative from Ohio from 1863 to 1865 and again from 1871 to 1873.

Early life and career 
Born near Piqua, Ohio, McKinney attended the country and private schools, the Piqua Academy, and the Ohio Wesleyan College, Delaware, Ohio.
He studied law.
He was admitted to the bar in 1850 and commenced practice in Piqua.
He served as delegate to all the Democratic National Conventions from 1850 to 1888.

Congress 
McKinney was elected as a Democrat to the Thirty-eighth Congress (March 4, 1863 – March 3, 1865).
He was an unsuccessful candidate in 1864 for reelection to the Thirty-ninth Congress.

McKinney was again elected to the Forty-second Congress (March 4, 1871 – March 3, 1873).
He was not a candidate for renomination in 1872.

Later career and death 
He resumed the practice of law.
He served as chairman of the Democratic State executive committee in 1879 and 1880.
He died in Piqua, Ohio, June 13, 1903.
He was interred in Forest Hill Cemetery.

In 1853 McKinney married Louisa Wood, who had seven children. He was a Freemason.

Notes

References

Sources

1827 births
1903 deaths
People from Piqua, Ohio
Ohio Wesleyan University alumni
19th-century American politicians
Democratic Party members of the United States House of Representatives from Ohio